=Love (イコールラブ Ikōrurabu, pronounced "equal love", stylized as =LOVE) is a Japanese idol group composed of voice actors from the Yoyogi Animation Academy. The twelve-person group is produced by former AKB48 and HKT48 member Rino Sashihara and is signed under Sacra Music.

History

2017 
On 28 January 2017, Rino Sashihara announced during a press conference that she plans to creating an idol group with voice actors from Yoyogi Animation Academy with the goal of "surpassing Yasushi Akimoto", the creator of established idol groups such as AKB48 and Nogizaka46. Auditions for the group began two days later. On 29 April 2017, it was announced that thirteen people passed the auditions and the group would be named "=Love". One member, Mai Chōnan, dropped out after the announcement, bringing the final number of members to twelve.

The group's first live performance came at the 2017 Tokyo Idol Festival, a venue they would continue to visit for the next two years. During their performance, =Love debuted their upcoming self-titled single, "=Love". The single was released on 6 September 2017, where it reached 8th on the Oricon Singles Chart and 14th on the Billboard Japan Hot 100.

On 6 December 2017, they released their 2nd single, "Bokura no Seifuku Christmas".

2018 
Between 15 and 18 February 2018, =Love appeared in their first stage play, a 2.5D musical based on the media franchise Kemono Friends.  They also held their first overseas performances in Taiwan, first on 18 March at the Megaport Music Festival in Kaohsiung, then a solo live on 25 March at the Syntrend Creative Park in Taipei. They also performed at the Japan Expo in Paris on 6 July.

On 16 May, they released their third single, "Teokure Caution".

On 2 August, it was announced that member Maika Sasaki would be taking a break from group activities. Thus, she would not participate in the upcoming fourth single.

On 17 October, they released their fourth single, "Want you! Want you!".

On 9 December, Maika Sasaki resumed group activities after four months of hiatus.

2019 
On 24 February 2019, Sashihara unveiled =Love's sister group, ≠Me (pronounced "not equal me", stylized as ≠ME). The sister group also has twelve members from Yoyogi Animation Academy and is produced by Sashihara. The two groups performed together at the 2019 Tokyo Idol Festival, where ≠Me unveiled their own self-titled debut single.

On 24 April 2019, they released their 5th single, "Sagase Diamond Lily".

On 19 August 2019, it was announced that the group's center, Hitomi Takamatsu would be on hiatus due to health issues and would not participate in the upcoming 6th single.

2020 
On 15 April 2020, a special track, "Tsugi ni Aeta Toki Nani wo Hanasou Ka na" , by =Love and ≠Me was released. This was Hitomi Takamatsu's first appearance since her hiatus.

They released their 7th single, "Cameo", on 29 April 2020 with members Emiri Ōtani and Nagisa Saito as double centers.

On 6 September during their "3RD ANNIVERSARY PREMIUM CONCERT", where Hitomi Takamatsu officially resumes activities.

In November 2020, they released their 8th single, "Seishun Subliminal". This is Hitomi Takamats's first single after her hiatus and Nonno Satake's last.

2021 
On 1 February 2021, it was announced that Nonno Satake will be graduating from the group. Her graduation concert was on 6 March.

The group's first album, "Zenbu, Naisho.", was released on 12 May 2021.

They released their 9th single, "Weekend Citron", on 25 August. They performed on Music Station for the first time on September 17.

They released their 10th single, "The 5th", on 15 December.

2022 
On 29 March 2022, =Love's second sister group,  (pronounced "nearly equal joy", stylized as ≒JOY), was unveiled. As with ≠Me, this group initially had 12 members. However, former Last Idol member Ozawa Aimi was announced as the 13th member of the group on 28 June 2022.

They released their 11th single, "Ano ko Complex", on 25 May.

The group's 12th single, "Be Selfish," was released on 28 September, 2022. The title track, "Be Selfish," was the group's first music video to have been made outside Japan, with filming and production being carried out by a Korean team based in South Korea.

On 25 September 2022, during their 5th anniversary performance, Nagisa Saitō announced her graduation from the group. Her graduation concert was held on 13 January 2023.

Members

Current members

Former members

Timeline 

 Blue (vertical) = Singles
 Red (vertical) = Albums

Discography

Studio albums

Singles

Notes

External links

References 

Japanese idol groups
Japanese girl groups
Musical groups established in 2017
2017 establishments in Japan